
This is a list of aircraft in alphabetical order beginning with 'Ts'.

Ts

TsAGI 
(Tsentrahl'nyy Aerodinamicheskiy i Ghidrodinamicheskiy Institoot- central aerodynamics and hydrodynamics institute) - Also written as CAHI or ZAGI.
 TsAGI 1-EA
 TsAGI 2-EA
 TsAGI 3-EA
 TsAGI 5-EA
 TsAGI 11-EA
 TsAGI 11-EA PV
 TsAGI A-4
 TsAGI A-6
 TsAGI A-8
 TsAGI A-7
 TsAGI A-7bis
 TsAGI A-7-Za
 TsAGI A-12
 TsAGI A-13
 TsAGI A-14
 TsAGI A-15
 TsAGI LS

TsKB 
(Tsentrahl'noye konstrooktorskoye byuro - central construction bureau)
 TsKB-1
 TsKB-3
 TsKB-4
 TsKB-5
 TsKB-6
 TsKB-7
 TsKB-8
 TsKB-10
 TsKB-11
 TsKB-12
 TsKB-15
 TsKB-18
 TsKB-19
 TsKB-21
 TsKB-23
 TsKB-24
 TsKB-25
 TsKB-26
 TsKB-26P
 TsKB-27
 TsKB-29
 TsKB-30
 TsKB-32
 TsKB-33
 TsKB-38
 TsKB-43
 TsKB-44
 TsKB-48
 TsKB-54
 TsKB-55
 TsKB-56
 TsKB-57
 TsKB-60

Tsuzuku 
(Tetsusaburo Tsuzuku)
 Tsuzuku No.1
 Tsuzuku No.2
 Tsuzuku No.3

Tsybin 
(Designer. P. V. Tsybin)
 Kolesnikov-Tsibin KC-20
 Tsybin Ts-25
 Tsybin NM-1
 Tsybin RSR
 Tsybin-Shavrov-Bartini RGSR

References

Further reading

External links 

 List of aircraft (T)